Terna Energy is a Greek renewable energy company that is listed on the Athens Exchange.

The company is a subsidiary of Greek conglomerate GEK Terna, which through its subsidiary Heron S.A. is as well involved in the construction and operation of thermoelectric power generation fuelled with natural gas. Terna Energy however exclusively produces energy from renewable energy sources, including wind farms and small hydroelectric plants. It also constructs renewable energy plants and integrated process units for the overall management and energy utilization of wastes and biomass.

The company was incorporated in 1997 as a subsidiary of Terna, which in 1999 merged with GEK to form Greece's largest conglomerate. The Athens-based company has been listed at the Athens Exchange since 2009 and belongs to the 25 companies forming the FTSE/Athex Large Cap index. In 2013, U.S. investment firm York Capital Magagement bought a 10% share of parent company GEK Terna and another 3% share of Terna Energy.

See also

 Energy in Greece

References

Sources

External links
  

Renewable energy companies of Greece
Construction and civil engineering companies of Greece
Companies based in Athens
Energy companies established in 1997
Renewable resource companies established in 1997
Companies listed on the Athens Exchange
Greek brands
Greek companies established in 1997